The 607080 Show was a 1970s British lifestyle television programme aimed at retired people that was presented by Roy Hudd and Irene Thomas.

The studio based programme was directed by Giles Oakley, produced for BBC One by Brigit Barry and broadcast on Sundays. It included financial advice, health tips and hobbies for older people, nostalgic music and guests such as the Minister of State for Social Security Alf Morris.  The title of the programme was pronounced '6 O 7 O 8 O show'. Roy Hudd was under 40 at the time and neither presenter was in the target age range when the programme was first broadcast.

References

BBC Television shows